Robert D. Henderson was a Scottish professional footballer who played as a winger. He played in the English Football League for Burnley and New Brighton.

References

Scottish footballers
Burnley F.C. players
New Brighton A.F.C. players
English Football League players
Association football midfielders
Year of birth missing